Mika Immonen (born 17 December 1972) is a Finnish professional Hall of Fame pool player, nicknamed "The Iceman."

Career
Immonen was born in London, England, and began playing Snooker at an early age and was known to have made several century breaks, before becoming pool player in the early 90s.

Immonen won the 2001 WPA World Nine-ball Championship in Cardiff, Wales. That same year, he was the runner-up to Corey Deuel in the US Open Nine-ball Championship

In 2002 he won the UPA International Ten-ball Championship.

He has represented Team Europe on thirteen occasions in the Mosconi Cup, most recently in 2013. During the 2008 event Immonen was crowned MVP, forever banishing bad memories of a costly miss in the final game of the 2006 event.

In early 2009, Immonen was awarded the title of Player of the Year. Subsequently, he also claimed that title for season 2009 and was awarded early 2010.

Immonen is a two-time Men's Division title-holder of the US Open Nine-ball Championship, where the world's top professional billiard players compete in Chesapeake, Virginia. In 2009 Immonen won 14 straight matches, finishing with a close 13–10 victory over Ralf Souquet in the finals. On 26 October 2008, Immonen claimed a 13–7 victory and pocketed the first-place prize of US$40,000 against runner-up Filipino Ronato Alcano, who settled for $20,000.

Immonen made it to the finals of the 2009 Dragon 14.1 Tournament, were he was defeated in the finals by Stephan Cohen of France. Also in 2009, Immonen bested Darren Appleton to win the International Challenge of Champions, a tournament where he once reached the finals in 2002 but lost the sudden-death rack to Efren Reyes.

In late November 2009 Immonen finally won his second World Title in Manila at the WPA World Ten-ball Championships. He Dominated the Philippine hope Lee Van Corteza in the finals 11–6.

Billiard Congress of American Hall of Fame class of 2014, at age of 41. 

In September 2016, in New York, he won the Dragon 14.1 Tournament, defeating Earl Strickland 300–270 in the finals.

Career titles

Instructional Releases
In late 2008 Mika teamed up with Intrinsic Media to produce MASTERING POOL, a 3-part pocket billiard instructional series. The DVD series is packed with tips, techniques, systems, 3D animated diagrams, and expert commentary by Immonen himself.

See also

External links
Mastering Pool Instructional DVD Series
2008 U.S. Open 9-Ball Championship Double Elimination Tournament Bracket
2008 U.S. Open 9-Ball Championship image gallery

References

Finnish pool players
1972 births
Living people
World champions in pool
WPA World Nine-ball Champions
WPA World Ten-ball Champions
Straight pool world champions